Sweet Marie is a 1925 American short silent comedy film directed by Philadelphian director Benjamin Stoloff and starring Sid Smith.

Cast
 Sid Smith as Doughboy
 Judy King as Sweet Marie
 Jules Cowles as The Top Sergeant
 Pal the Dog as Pal
 Virginia Marshall as Little Girl (uncredited)

References

External links

 

1925 films
1925 comedy films
American silent short films
Films directed by Benjamin Stoloff
1925 short films
Silent American comedy films
American comedy short films
American black-and-white films
1920s American films